The 2013 Pacific typhoon season was the most active Pacific typhoon season since 2004, and the deadliest since 1975 Pacific typhoon season. It featured one of the most powerful storms in history.  It was an above-average season with 31 named storms, 13 typhoons, and five super typhoons. The season's first named storm, Sonamu, developed on January 4 while the season's last named storm, Podul, dissipated on November 15. Most of the first seventeen named storms before mid-September were relatively weak, as only two of them reached typhoon intensity. Total damage amounted to at least $26.41 billion (USD), making it the third costliest Pacific typhoon season on record; behind 2018 Pacific typhoon season and 2019 Pacific typhoon season.

Typhoon Soulik in July was the strongest tropical cyclone to affect Taiwan in 2013. In August, Typhoon Utor cost US$3.55 billion damage and killed 97 people, becoming the second deadliest tropical cyclone of the Philippines in 2013. Three systems in August, Pewa, Unala and 03C, continuously crossed the International Date Line from the Central Pacific and entered this basin. Typhoon Haiyan caused catastrophic damage and devastation to the Philippines as a Category 5 super typhoon, killing more than 6,300 people, making it one of the deadliest Pacific typhoons on record.

The scope of this article is limited to the Pacific Ocean to the north of the equator between 100°E and the 180th meridian. Within the northwestern Pacific Ocean, there are two separate agencies that assign names to tropical cyclones, which often results in a storm having two names. The Japan Meteorological Agency (JMA) will name a tropical cyclone should it be judged to have 10-minute sustained wind speeds of at least  anywhere in the basin, whilst the Philippine Atmospheric, Geophysical and Astronomical Services Administration (PAGASA) assigns names to tropical cyclones which move into or form as tropical depressions in their area of responsibility, located between 115°E and 135°E and between 5°N and 25°N, regardless of whether or not the tropical cyclone has already been given a name by the JMA. Tropical depressions monitored by the United States' Joint Typhoon Warning Center (JTWC) are given a number with a "W" suffix.

Seasonal forecasts

During each season, several national meteorological services and scientific agencies forecast how many tropical cyclones, tropical storms, and typhoons will form during a season and/or how many tropical cyclones will affect a particular country. These agencies include the Tropical Storm Risk (TSR) Consortium of the University College London, Philippine Atmospheric, Geophysical and Astronomical Services Administration (PAGASA) and the Vietnamese National Center for Hydro Meteorological forecasts (VNCHMF).

In early December 2012, the VNCHMF noted that a tropical depression or a tropical storm could form within December or January and affect Southern Vietnam. Within its January — June seasonal climate outlook, PAGASA predicted that two to three tropical cyclones were likely to develop and/or enter the Philippine area of responsibility between January and March while two to four were predicted for the April to June period. On March 3, the VNCHMF predicted that there would be 11–13 tropical cyclones over the South China Sea during the season, with 5-6 directly affecting Vietnam. Later that month the Hong Kong Observatory, predicted that the typhoon season in Hong Kong would be near normal with four to seven tropical cyclones passing within  of the territory compared to an average of 6. In late April, the China Meteorological Administration's Shanghai Typhoon Institute (CMA-STI) predicted that between 22 and 25 tropical storms would develop within the basin during the year, while the Thai Meteorological Department (TMD) predicted that at least two tropical storms would move towards Thailand during 2013. The first of the two tropical storms was predicted to pass near Upper Thailand in either August or September, while the other one was expected to move to the south of Southern Thailand during October or November. On May 7, the TSR Consortium released their first forecast of the season and predicted that the basin would see a near average season with 25.6 tropical storms, 16 typhoons, 8.9 "intense" typhoons and an ACE index of about 311 units.

In late June after a slow start to the season Taiwan's Central Weather Bureau predicted that the season, would be near average of 25.7 with 23–27 tropical storms occurring over the basin during 2013. Between two and four of the systems were also predicted to affect Taiwan compared to an average of around 3.6. Within its July forecast update TSR noted that despite the slow start to the season, they continued to anticipate either near or slightly above-normal activity for the remainder of 2013; however, the ACE index was reduced slightly to 294 units. During July, PAGASA predicted that between eight and eleven tropical cyclones were likely to develop and/or enter the Philippine area of responsibility between July and September while five to eight were predicted to occur between October and December. Later in the month the VNCHMF, predicted that nine to ten tropical cyclones would be observed within the South China Sea, during the rest of the year. They also predicted that four to five tropical cyclones would directly affect Vietnam, while the CMA-STI predicted that between 22 and 25 tropical storms would develop or move into the basin during the year. On August 6, TSR released their August update and significantly lowered their forecast to 22.3 tropical storms, 13.2 typhoons, 6.6 "intense" typhoons and an ACE index of about 230, which they noted would result in activity about 20% below their 1965–2012 average. This was because the season was running about 60% below the expected year-to-date activity and only one to two typhoons had developed by the end of July. During October 2013, the VNCHMF predicted that one to two tropical cyclones would develop and possibly affect Vietnam between November 2013 and April 2014.

Season summary 

The first two-thirds of the season were very weak, with only two typhoons forming despite the average amount of named storms forming. However, the season became dramatically active since mid-September. The last fourteen named storms formed within approximately two months, yet only three of them were below the typhoon strength. Initially, Typhoon Man-yi made landfall over Japan. Tropical Depression 18W, known in Vietnam as Tropical Storm No.8, flooding triggered by the storm in Vietnam, Laos and Thailand damaged nearly US$80 million and 23 deaths. Typhoon Usagi made landfall over Guangdong, China and cost US$4.6 billion in the country, which was the third strongest storm of the basin in 2013. Later, Typhoon Wutip made landfall over Vietnam. In early October, Typhoon Fitow made landfall over Fujian, China and caused over US$10 billion damage, becoming the costliest tropical cyclone in 2013. Typhoon Danas affected Japan and South Korea, but without significant damage.

Typhoon Nari brought significant damage over the Philippines and eventually made landfall over Vietnam, as well as Typhoon Wipha which killed 41 people in Japan. Typhoon Francisco and Typhoon Lekima did not directly affect any country, but they were both violent typhoons, especially the latter one becoming the second strongest of this basin in 2013. Typhoon Krosa crossed northern Luzon on October 31 and intensified further, although it dissipated in the South China Sea. In early November, Tropical Depression Wilma formed over the Caroline Islands, moved out of the basin, and ultimately arrived in the Arabian Sea in mid-November.

At the same time in early November, Typhoon Haiyan initially affected Palau significantly. The typhoon later became one of the most intense tropical cyclones on record and immediately made landfall over the Philippines. After arriving at the South China Sea, Haiyan made landfall over Vietnam and also impact Guangxi and Hainan provinces of China. Typhoon Haiyan, also known as Typhoon Yolanda, caused 6,300 fatalities and over US$2 billion damage in the Philippines, becoming the deadliest and costliest typhoon in modern Philippine history.

Systems

Severe Tropical Storm Sonamu (Auring) 

Over the next couple of days, the depression moved northwestward and gradually developed in an area of moderate windshear. Late on January 2, the center passed over the Philippine island of Mindanao but maintained its deep convective banding, which prompted the JTWC to issue a Tropical Cyclone Formation Alert (TCFA). During the next day, PAGASA named the depression Auring. The system moved westwards into the Sulu Sea, and the JTWC initiated advisories on the system as 01W. The JMA reported later that day that the depression intensified into Tropical Storm Sonamu, before the JTWC followed suit early on January 4 as the system continued to consolidate. Early on January 8, the JMA and JTWC reported that Sonamu weakened into a tropical depression.

Within the Philippines, 1 person drowned while another person died after being hit by a coconut tree. A passenger ship was stranded near the coast of Dumaguete City on January 3 before being rescued.

Tropical Depression Bising 

Over the next few days the JMA continued to monitor the system as a tropical depression, before PAGASA named it Bising during January 11. Over the next few days the system moved towards the north-northeast, before it was last noted during January 13, as it weakened into an area of low pressure.

Bising caused moderate to heavy rains across Bicol Region, Eastern Visayas, Central Visayas and Mindanao. A school laboratory in Lanuza was damaged, and the loss were amounted to Php1.5 million (US$37,000).

Tropical Storm Shanshan (Crising) 

With low to moderate wind shear, the depression developed further. On February 19, the JTWC initiated warnings on Tropical Depression 02W, but discontinued advisories two days later after the circulation became poorly defined and convection was sheared. However, the JMA reported that the depression intensified into Tropical Storm Shanshan on February 21. The next day, Shanshan weakened into a tropical depression before dissipating east of Natuna Islands.

Heavy rains from the storm triggered flooding in the southern Philippines that killed eleven people and left two others missing. The storm damaged 1,346 houses, while crop damage estimated to be ₱11.2 million (US$275,000). On February 20, classes in three cities in Cebu were suspended due to heavy rains.

Tropical Storm Yagi (Dante) 

On June 6, a tropical depression formed southeast of the Philippines within an area of moderate wind shear. Located along the western edge of the subtropical ridge, the system gradually intensified while moving to the northeast, aided by strong divergence. On June 7, PAGASA named the system Dante, and the next day the JMA upgraded the depression to Tropical Storm Yagi. Later, the JTWC initiated advisories and quickly upgraded to tropical storm status after the system consolidated. However, the storm was soon impacted by northwesterly wind shear, causing the system to become disorganized and weaken in intensity.

After Yagi had enhanced the southwest monsoon which brought heavy rain to parts of the Philippines, PAGASA declared that the rainy season had begun on June 10, 2013. Yagi also brought some rain to parts of Japan, including the island of Honshu.

Tropical Storm Leepi (Emong) 

Early on June 16, a tropical depression formed southeast of the Philippines, which PAGASA named Emong. Late on June 17, the JTWC initiated advisories on Tropical Depression 04W. The next day, the JMA upgraded the depression to Tropical Storm Leepi on June 18 after further organization and a general northward movement. Interaction with a tropical upper tropospheric trough (TUTT) cell to the east of Leepi sheared the convection to the southwest of the center, which consisted of several smaller circulations. Based on this occurrence, the JTWC downgraded the system to tropical depression intensity early on June 20, and early the next day, the JMA declared Leepi as extratropical near southwestern Japan. The storm fully dissipated early on June 24.

Due to heavy rainfall from the precursor system, PAGASA issued a flash flood warning for parts of Mindanao. Heavy precipitation was reported in Davao City, as well as Greater Manila, where the Metropolitan Manila Development Authority offered free rides to stricken commuters. This system caused rains over parts of the Philippines including Southern Luzon, Visayas and Northern Mindanao. Later, the outer rainbands of Leepi caused downpours over eastern Taiwan. Despite losing much of its convection before reaching Japan, the remnants of Leepi continued to drop heavy rainfall. In Umaji, Kōchi, a station recorded  of rain in a 24-hour period, more than half of the average June rainfall for the station.

Tropical Storm Bebinca (Fabian) 

The disturbance gradually organized, and was classified as a tropical depression by the JMA at 1800 UTC on June 19; PAGASA followed suit six hours later, naming the system Fabian. Despite wind shear generated by a subtropical ridge, the depression maintained a well-defined circulation, allowing the system to intensify. At 0000 UTC on June 21, the JMA upgraded the cyclone to Tropical Storm Bebinca. Following this upgrade in strength, however, Bebinca failed to intensify further, and leveled out in intensity prior to making landfall on Hainan on June 22. Bebinca's passage weakened the system to tropical depression strength, and, despite moving over the Gulf of Tonkin, failed to restrengthen before making a final landfall on June 23 east of Hanoi.

Due to the potential effects of Bebinca, Sanya Phoenix International Airport cancelled or delayed 147 inbound and outbound flights, leaving 8,000 passengers stranded. In Beibu Bay, a fishing boat with four fishermen on board lost communication contact with the mainland, but were found the subsequent day. A total of 21.7 million people were affected, and damage amounted to ¥10 million (US$1.63 million).

Severe Tropical Storm Rumbia (Gorio) 

In late June, a low-pressure area persisted within the ITCZ east of the Philippines. Initially tracking southward, the disturbance moved east and then recurved to the west. Steadily organizing, the disturbance became a tropical depression on June 27, moving to the northwest due to a nearby ridge. On June 28, the disturbance strengthened into Tropical Storm Rumbia, and the next day made its first landfall on Eastern Samar in the Philippines. The storm weakened slightly before moving ashore the Leizhou Peninsula in China late that day. Due to land interaction, Rumbia quickly weakened into a low-pressure area on July 2 and dissipated soon after.

Upon landfall in the Philippines, Rumbia caused extensive flooding across multiple islands, which disrupted transportation and displaced thousands of people. Power outages resulted from the heavy rain and strong winds, and seven deaths were reported within Concepción, Iloilo after an unnamed motorbanca capsized. At its landfall in China, Rumbia damaged large swaths of agricultural cropland and destroyed at least 112 buildings, causing ¥7.68 million in damage.

Typhoon Soulik (Huaning) 

In early July, an upper-level cold-core low persisted well to the northeast of Guam. Gaining tropical characteristics, the system soon developed a surface low and became a tropical depression early on July 7. Tracking generally westward, a motion it would retain for its entire existence, the depression underwent a period of rapid intensification starting on July 8 that culminated in Soulik attaining its peak strength early on July 10. Thereafter, an eyewall replacement cycle and cooler waters weakened the system. Though it passed over the warm waters of the Kuroshio Current the following day, dry air soon impinged upon the typhoon. Soulik later made landfall late on July 12 in northern Taiwan before weakening in to a tropical storm. Briefly emerging over the Taiwan Strait, the storm moved onshore for a second time in Fujian on July 13. The system was last noted on July 14, as it dissipated over land.

Numerous trees and power lines fell, leaving roughly 800,000 without electricity. Severe flooding prompted thousands to evacuate as well. Four people died on the island while 123 more were injured. In East China, more than 162 million people were affected by the storm. Heavy rains and typhoon-force winds caused extensive damage and killed 11 people.

Tropical Storm Cimaron (Isang) 

A tropical disturbance formed east of the Philippines on July 15. Later that day, it was given the name Isang by the PAGASA. Early the next day, it intensified into Tropical Storm Cimaron as it made several thunderstorms. Its remnants stayed east of Taiwan on July 19 and it finally dissipated on July 20.

On July 17, a lightning incident within the Philippine province of Ilocos Sur, left two people dead and two others injured. Torrential rains over southern Fujian Province triggered significant flooding, with areas already saturated from Typhoon Soulik less than a week prior. Many homes were inundated and several roads were washed out. Some areas experienced 1-in-500-year flooding. Approximately 20.28 million people were affected by the storm, 8.92 million of whom were temporarily relocated. At least one person was killed and another was reported missing. An unusually intense thunderstorm associated with Cimaron produced a prolific lightning event over Xiamen, with 406 strikes recorded in two hours.

Severe Tropical Storm Jebi (Jolina) 

During the next three days, the low-pressure area crossed the Philippines and arrived on the West Philippine Sea on July 30, located west of Batangas. After favorable conditions, both PAGASA and JMA upgraded the system into a tropical depression and was named Jolina. On July 31, the JMA upgraded the system into a tropical storm and was given the international name Jebi. On September 2, The JMA upgraded Jebi into severe tropical storm. Jebi weakened into tropical storm and made landfall over Northern Vietnam On September 3, as well as the JTWC and JMA downgraded into tropical storm. Jebi weakened into tropical depression, as the JMA and the JTWC issued their final warning.

In Cotabato City, incessant rains caused by the low-pressure area in Mindanao submerged 25 of its 37 villages. The floods forced the city government to suspend classes for elementary both public and private schools. Heavy rains also flooded areas around the Liguasan marshland, including 14 low-lying towns in Maguindanao and seven towns in North Cotabato.

At least 7 people were killed in Vietnam. The most extensive losses took place in Quảng Ninh Province where 320 homes and 200 hectares of crops were damaged. Losses in the area amounted to VND10 billion (US$476,000).

Tropical Storm Mangkhut (Kiko) 

Later that day as the system consolidated further the JMA reported that the depression had developed into a tropical storm and named it Mangkhut, before the JTWC initiated advisories and designated it as Tropical Depression 10W. Over the next couple of days the system moved towards the north-northwest before it made landfall in Northern Vietnam during August 7 before it was last noted early the next day as it dissipated over Laos.

Typhoon Utor (Labuyo) 

During the next day, the JMA reported that the depression intensified into Tropical Storm Utor. Shortly thereafter, Utor began undergoing explosive intensification, achieving typhoon status early on August 10, as an eye developed. The system became exceptionally symmetrical, as the convective bands had further deepened, which prompted JTWC upgrading Utor to a super typhoon. Continuing westward, Utor made landfall over northern Luzon that evening. It emerged into the South China Sea as a weakened storm, and Utor failed to re-intensify significantly. At 07:50 UTC on August 14, Utor made landfall over Yangjiang in Guangdong, as a minimal typhoon. 

The Aurora province suffered the most damage from the typhoon, especially the coastal town of Casiguran. The capital of Manila received heavy rain but no significant damage was reported. 80 percent of the infrastructure was believed to be destroyed at Casiguran (about 2,000 homes). A total of over 12,000 homes were damaged. The town was isolated from the rest of the area when Utor's wind toppled transmission lines and cut off power. 158,000 residents were evacuated in southern China. One person was killed in China, and hundreds of flights were either cancelled or delayed. The crew abandoned the vessel and were saved by rescue workers.

Tropical Depression 13W

After interacting with Trami, the depression hit the Eastern Chinese coast and dissipated on August 18 and its remnants continued to move westerly track.

Severe Tropical Storm Trami (Maring) 

During that day, the low level circulation consolidated while moving to the southeast, given the name Maring by PAGASA. It interacted with another depression to the north, exhibiting the Fujiwhara effect. On August 18, the depression also known as Maring strengthened into a Tropical Storm Trami according to the JMA, while steadily tracking generally eastwards. Trami weakened below typhoon intensity on August 23. The remnants of the system continued to move inland in a westerly direction. Trami made landfall in the Fujian province of China on August 22, 2:40 a.m. local time.

On August 18, officials in Luzon closed classes and government buildings in some cities due to heavy rainfall. Majors areas in Metro Manila and nearby provinces reported severe flooding. Four provinces and Metro Manila were declared a state of calamity, and there were 18 deaths. The Yaeyama and Miyako Islands of Japan were battered with gusts from Trami as the system headed for Taiwan and China. In Taiwan, the storm produced gale-force winds and heavy rainfall in northern Taiwan, with Taipei receiving  of rain. Trami injured 10 people and forced 6,000 to evacuate, but damage was minor in Taiwan. The system also intensified floods brought by earlier monsoonal rains in China, wreaking havoc.

Severe Tropical Storm Pewa 

During August 20 the JTWC reported that Pewa had become equivalent to a Category 1 hurricane on the SSHS, before reporting that the system had weakened into a tropical storm. Later that day, it was classified as a severe tropical storm by the JMA but wasn't classified as a typhoon. Pewa moved northwest as weak vertical windshear caused it to slowly weaken on August 22. On August 23, vertical windshear caused Pewa to weaken as it moved north. Pewa was then downgraded to a tropical storm later that day. Very early on August 25, Pewa was downgraded to a storm by the JMA. The next day, Pewa's circulation became exposed as it became a depression. On August 26, Pewa fully dissipated.

Tropical Storm Unala 

During August 19, the JMA and JTWC reported that Tropical Storm Unala had moved into the Western Pacific basin from the Central Pacific, as it rapidly weakened and moved westwards into the periphery of Severe Tropical Storm Pewa. The system was last noted by the JMA later that day as it weakened into a tropical depression and dissipated.

Severe Tropical Storm Kong-rey (Nando) 

On August 23, an area of convection persisted southeast of Manila. As indicated in global models, the system is forecast to consolidate as it moves poleward to more favorable environment conditions. On August 25, the JMA announced the formation of a tropical depression to the east of the Philippines and PAGASA allocated the designation Nando. The next day, the JTWC also upgraded it to a tropical depression, designating it as 14W. Later that day, the JMA upgraded Nando to a tropical storm, naming it Kong-rey. Kong-rey brought heavy showers and gusty winds in the Philippines as the storm continued to intensify. On August 28, Kong-rey reached Severe Tropical Storm strength. It was then later has an exposed circulation shortly then it was downgraded to a tropical storm on August 29 as it is reported that 3 were killed in Taiwan. Both agencies downgraded Kong-rey to a weak tropical depression, until they made their final advisory on August 30.

Damage in East China reached ¥130 million (US$21.2 million).

Tropical Storm Yutu 

Moving northeast, over the next three days the depression gradually developed further before the JMA named it Yutu on September 1. Later that day, as dry air wrapped into the circulation and strong vertical wind shear affected the system, the JTWC declared it a subtropical low. Meanwhile, the JMA reported that Yutu had weakened into a tropical depression. Over the next few days, Yutu performed a small loop and started to move westwards.

Severe Tropical Storm Toraji 

Late on August 30, a disturbance formed west of Taiwan from the outer rainbands of Kong-rey.
It was then later, designated as 15W by the JTWC as it moved towards the east of Taiwan. Favorable conditions of strengthening to a tropical storm as it heads to wards warm waters. Just nearly the same time when Yutu was declared a tropical storm, Tropical Depression 15W rapidly intensified into Tropical Storm Toraji. Toraji entered the southern islands of Japan as it intensified. On September 2, Toraji created a small unbalanced eye as it rapidly races towards Japan. On September 3, moderate wind shear occurred as the JMA upgraded Toraji to a severe tropical storm as it enters the southern coast of Japan killing 3. Strong vertical wind shear made Toraji weaken to a depression. The JMA reported on September 4, that Toraji had degenerated into an extratropical low, before it dissipated during the next day.

Typhoon Man-yi 

A large disturbance formed near the Northern Mariana Islands late on September 9. It was designated as 16W by the JTWC and upgraded to Tropical storm Man-yi on September 12, moving northwestward. Man-yi intensifying and grew larger as the pressure dropped . Late on September 14, Man-yi became a severe tropical storm, forming a small eye, and the next day strengthened briefly into a typhoon. Man-yi turned northward toward Japan, making landfall on September 16 near Toyohashi. Around that time, the storm became extratropical, and on September 20 Man-yi dissipated near the Kamchatka Peninsula.

Across western Japan, hundreds of thousands of people were ordered to evacuate, including 260,000 in Kyoto. The JMA issued a "special warning" for three western Japan prefectures of Fukui, Kyoto, and Shiga. Over 70 people were injured and at least one person was killed. The government of Japan set up emergency task forces and employed rescue teams. Many homes were flooded and about 80,000 were without electricity in western and central Japan. Trains in Tokyo and its vicinity were suspended and hundreds of flights were grounded.

Tropical Depression 18W 

Over the next two days the depression gradually developed further as it moved westwards, before the JTWC issued a Tropical Cyclone Formation Alert late on September 17, as vertical windshear over the system decreased slightly. During the next day after the depressions low level circulation center had started to consolidate, the JTWC initiated advisories and designated it as Tropical Depression 18W. During that day the system moved westwards along the southern edge of the subtropical ridge of high pressure, before the JTWC issued its final warning on the system later that day after the depression had made landfall in Vietnam. Over the next couple of days the system continued to move westwards and moved through Vietnam, Laos and Thailand, before it was last noted on September 21, over the Thai province of Phetchabun.

In Vietnam, flooding triggered by the storm killed at least seven people and 5,000 homes were damaged or destroyed. Severe flooding took place in neighboring Laos where at least 10,000 structures were damaged and losses reached $61 million.

Typhoon Usagi (Odette) 

From the southwest monsoon combined with the outflow of Typhoon Man-yi, a couple of disturbances was created on September 14. During that day as the circulation became better defined, PAGASA named the system "Odette", and later JMA upgraded the system to Tropical Storm Usagi. On September 17, JTWC upgraded Usagi to a tropical storm, and the next day both JMA and JTWC upgraded Usagi to a typhoon due to a developing eye. On September 19, Usagi began explosive intensification and formed a round eye; as the result, JTWC upgraded Usagi to a Category 4 super typhoon on the SSHWS, and the typhoon reached its peak intensity at 18Z. On September 20, Usagi began an eyewall replacement cycle and weakened due to land interaction between Taiwan and Luzon. When Usagi entered the Bashi Channel early on September 21, JTWC downgraded it to a typhoon due to weakening convection. At 11:40 UTC (19:40 CST) on September 22, Usagi made landfall over Shanwei, Guangdong, China. Soon, JTWC issued the final warning of Usagi, and JMA downgraded it to a severe tropical storm at 18Z. On September 23, JMA downgraded Usagi to a tropical depression in Guangxi.

Severe Tropical Storm Pabuk 

Later that day, the JTWC upgraded it to a tropical storm as the JMA named it Pabuk very early on September 22. Pabuk just maintained its strength as it created a weak eye on September 23. Pabuk also enhanced the southwest monsoon which brought heavy floods in the Philippines and created a disturbance which will later be Typhoon Wutip. The eye became bigger as it headed towards warm waters the next day. Pabuk was upgraded to a Category 2 typhoon by the JTWC but the JMA still has called this as a severe tropical storm on September 24. After reaching its peak intensity the following day, Severe tropical storm Pabuk weaken to a Category 1 typhoon on early on September 26. It gradually weakened before transitioning into an extratropical cyclone on September 27. Pabuk fully dissipated as it crossed the International Date Line on September 29.

Typhoon Wutip (Paolo) 

A tropical disturbance formed from the southwest monsoon which was enhanced by Pabuk on September 23. On September 25, it became a tropical depression and slowly deepened off the west coast of the Philippines and named it Paolo by the PAGASA and classified as 20W by the JTWC early the next day. The system tracked west and strengthened into a tropical storm and named it Wutip on September 27 as it brought rainfall across Luzon. Tropical Storm Wutip became a severe tropical storm as it moved westwards on September 28, and rapidly became a typhoon. On September 29, Wutip became a Moderate Typhoon as it created an eye towards Thailand. 

As of September 29, 74 Chinese fishermen were missing after the storm sunk 3 fishing boats in the South China Sea near the Paracel Islands as Thailand and Vietnam braced for torrential rain and flooding. Fourteen survivors had been rescued. Rain reached Vietnam on September 30 and then Thailand the following day, killing 42 people in Vietnam. Wutip killed 77 people in southeastern Asia during late September and early October.

Tropical Storm Sepat 

A very weak low-pressure area formed on September 27. After transitioning into a tropical cyclone, the JMA reported that the system had become a tropical depression during the next day. After consolidating, the JMA reported that the system had become a tropical storm early on September 30. The JTWC subsequently designated the system as Tropical Depression 21W later that day, as they initiated advisories on the system. It impacted Japan on October 2 without any damages and casualties. Tropical Storm Sepat entered cool waters later that day and became extratropical.

Typhoon Fitow (Quedan) 

A large tropical disturbance formed east of Palau late on September 26. It intensified to a tropical depression on September 29, and the PAGASA named it Quedan and JTWC designated it with 22W later that day. On September 30, deep convection wrapped around Quedan as it became a tropical storm, and it was named Fitow on October 1. Fitow rapidly intensified into a Category 2 typhoon as it moved north on October 3. A large eye developed as Fitow slammed into the southern Japanese Islands late on October 4, killing two people. Chinese authorities recalled some 65,000 fishing boats as  wind gusts battered Wenzhou. 574,000 people were evacuated from Zhejiang and 177,000 from Fujian.

70% of downtown Yuyao was flooded, which led to damage valued at over 20 billion yuan as well as riots and action by riot police.

Chinese authorities reported one person killed in Wenzhou and two dock workers missing.

Typhoon Danas (Ramil) 

Over the next 2 days the system gradually developed further as the low level circulation consolidated and became better defined, before the JTWC initiated advisories and designated the system as Tropical Depression 23W during October 3. During the next day both the JTWC and the JMA reported that the depression had developed into a tropical storm with the latter naming it as Danas. On October 5, Danas became a severe tropical storm and rapidly became a Category 1 typhoon as it races west towards warm waters.

Late on the same day, some agencies reported that it would reach Category 5 strength because of explosive intensification occurring as more convection wraps the storm. Early on October 6, Typhoon Danas was classified as a Category 2-3 typhoon as a small eye developed as the PAGASA gave it the name Ramil as it passed through the corner of the Philippine area of responsibility later that day as a strong Category 3 typhoon. Typhoon Danas underwent explosive intensification as it steadily and slowly enters warm waters and it became a Category 4 typhoon. Its eye became wider and was classified as an annular typhoon and impacted the Ryukyu Islands on October 7. Typhoon Danas then rapidly weakened as it entered cool waters near Japan on October 8, and on October 9, Danas became extratropical as it headed toward the northern part of Japan. 

Damage in Jeju Island were at KRW245 million (US$228,000).

Typhoon Nari (Santi) 

During that day the system moved westwards along the southern edge of a subtropical ridge of high pressure, as it gradually developed further, before it was named Santi by PAGASA. Nari continued to intensify, and reached Category 3 status on October 11 as it moved west towards the Philippines and made landfall in Dingalan, Aurora. Power outages affected much of Central Luzon as the typhoon crossed the region. Five people were killed by falling trees and landslides from Nari as it weakened to a Category 2 typhoon on October 12. 
Within the Philippines a total of 15 people were left dead while 5 were missing, while total economic losses were amounted to be Php 12.3 billion (US$277.34 million).

Typhoon Wipha (Tino) 

Tropical Depression 25W formed 696 nautical miles south of Iwo Jima, Japan on October 10. It strengthened into Tropical Storm Wipha, then continued to intensify into a severe tropical storm and later a typhoon. Wipha then rapidly intensified into a Category 4 typhoon on October 13. During the morning of October 14, Wipha entered the Philippine area of responsibility, and PAGASA promptly named it Tino as it created an eyewall replacement cycle becoming a Category 4 typhoon later that day.

Typhoon Francisco (Urduja) 

During that day the depression gradually developed further before later that day the JTWC designated it as Tropical Depression 26W. It was subsequently named Francisco by the JMA as it very rapidly became a severe tropical storm early on October 17. Explosive intensification occurred, and Francisco evolved to a Category 5 super typhoon late on October 19 and reached peak intensity early later that day. Francisco slowly weakened as it underwent an eyewall replacement cycle. At noon on October 21, Francisco rapidly weakened to a Category 3 typhoon and became an annular typhoon. Very early on October 22, Francisco entered the Philippine area of responsibility and it was given the name Urduja, as convection around Francisco started to weaken later that day.

Tropical Depression 27W

The system gradually developed further within an area of moderate windshear that was off-set by an outflow mechanism, and early on October 19, the JTWC designated it as Tropical Depression 27W. During that day, the system moved northeastwards within an area of strong wind shear, along the southwestern edge of the subtropical ridge. The JTWC issued their final advisory on the system early on October 20, after convection diminished. The system was last noted by the JMA on October 23 southeast of Tokyo, Japan.

Typhoon Lekima 

Due to an increase in convection and a consolidating low level circulation centre, the JTWC issued a Tropical Cyclone Formation Alert on the system later that day. On October 20, the JTWC initiated advisories on the system later that day, while the JMA upgraded the system into Tropical Storm Lekima at 1800 UTC after it had developed into a tropical storm. The next day, the JMA reported that Lekima had become a severe tropical storm, while the JTWC reported that the system had become a typhoon.

After JMA upgraded Lekima to a typhoon early on October 22, the system began to undergo rapid deepening, developing a well-defined eye with a symmetric eyewall. Late on the same day, JTWC upgraded the system to a super typhoon with Category 5 strength on the Saffir–Simpson hurricane wind scale, owing to dual-channel outflow.

Since early on October 23, JMA reported that Lekima has reached peak intensity and maintained for over one day. However, morphed integrated microwave imageries at CIMSS (MIMIC) depict that Lekima underwent an eyewall replacement cycle late on that day and completed it one day later. Lekima started to slowly weaken on October 24, and JTWC downgraded it to a typhoon. On October 25, under moderate to strong westerly vertical wind shear and interacting with the mid-latitude westerlies, Lekima began an extratropical transition and lost the eyewall structure. On October 26, Lekima completed its transition east of Japan and weakened into a storm-force developed low. The low fully dissipated as it crossed the International Date Line on October 28.

Typhoon Krosa (Vinta) 

A non-tropical system formed late on October 23. It became a low-pressure area on October 26. On October 28, the system was given the designation 29W by the JTWC and named Vinta by the PAGASA. It became Tropical Storm Krosa by the JMA as it slowly intensified nearing the Philippines early on October 30. The next day, Krosa reached Category 1 typhoon intensity. Later that morning, the typhoon made landfall over Santa Ana, Cagayan. The typhoon intensified into a Category 2 typhoon soon after its Cagayan landfall. It is reported that 1 person died by heavy floods.

Tropical Depression 30W (Wilma)

A broad circulation formed early on October 31. On November 2, the tropical depression weakened into a low-pressure area. On November 3, the system regenerated into a tropical depression, and the JTWC issued a Tropical Cyclone Formation Alert. The storm was then given the name Wilma by the PAGASA, and the designation 30W by the JTWC, as it impacted northern Mindanao. On November 4, Wilma weakened, and spawned a waterspout that caused minor damage. On November 6, the system impacted Vietnam, before it became a remnant low late on November 7. Then on November 8, the remnants of the storm continued to move west, crossing the 100th meridian east, and affecting Myanmar. The storm crossed the Malay Peninsula into the Bay of Bengal later on the same day.

Typhoon Haiyan (Yolanda)

 

Within the Philippines, Haiyan was the worst tropical cyclone to impact the island nation, as it became both the deadliest and most damaging typhoon since reliable records started in 1970. According to The Philippine National Disaster Risk Reduction and Management Council, a total of 6,300 people were reported to have died in Haiyan, with 5,902 or 93% of the deaths occurring in Eastern Visayas. The cause of most of these deaths was attributed to trauma and people drowning, however, other causes included being electrocuted and hit by uprooted trees. A total of 8000 deaths were associated with the storm and total damages were estimated at Php571 billion (US$13 billion).

In Vietnam, 14 people were killed indirectly by the storm. Haiyan also triggered floods in Mainland China, leaving 30 people dead and damages of CN¥4.58 billion (US$750 million).

Tropical Storm Podul (Zoraida) 

Early on November 9, the JMA reported that a disorganized tropical depression had developed to the southeast of Koror, Palau. Following an increase in organization, the JTWC issued a Tropical Cyclone Formation Alert for the system during November 10, as it was named Zoraida by PAGASA. Early on November 12, Tropical Depression Zoraida made landfall over Davao Oriental province in Eastern Mindando, before it moved into the Sulu Sea later that day.

Early on November 15, the JTWC issued their final warning on Podul, as the remnants of the system's low level circulation center made landfall over Vietnam. After moving westwards through Vietnam and Cambodia and into the Gulf of Thailand, Podul was last noted by the JMA and the Thai Meteorological Department during the next day. The remnants of Podul later entered the Bay of Bengal and regenerated into Severe Cyclonic Storm Helen.

Tropical Depression 33W 

Over the next day, the system quickly developed into a tropical depression, within marginal environment for further development, before it was declared to be a tropical depression during December 3. However, the system quickly weakened and was last noted as it dissipated over the Pacific Ocean to the northeast of Guam during the next day.

Other systems 

Over the next two days the system moved towards the west-northwest, before it was last noted by the JMA during March 22, as it dissipated over Southern Mindanao.

Over the next day the system moved towards the north-east and in conjunction with an area of high pressure located over south-eastern China, brought strong winds to south-eastern China and Hong Kong. The system was subsequently last noted by the CMA during the next day while it was located over Hainan Island.

Tropical Depression Three-C moved into the Western Pacific basin, from the Central Pacific during August 20. However, the system quickly dissipated within the Western Pacific, as it suffered from increased vertical wind shear, which was caused by the outflow of Typhoon Pewa. Remaining nearly stationary, dry air started to wrap in to the system's fully exposed low level circulation center. 

The next day, the depression moved towards the west-northwest before it was last noted by the JMA later that day. On September 23, the JMA noted that a tropical depression had briefly developed about  the north of Wake Island. Over the next day, the system remained nearly stationary before it was last noted on October 4. On October 4, the JMA started to monitor a tropical depression, that had developed within the Gulf of Thailand. Over the next couple of days, the system moved westward within an area of low to moderate vertical wind shear, before it passed over the Malay Peninsula and moved out of the Western Pacific Basin on October 6, and later developed into Cyclone Phailin.

During that day it moved westwards, but was last noted by the JMA later that day. Over the next few days the system moved towards the west-northwest and moved into an extremely favorable environment, for further development while located over the Malay Peninsula during November 21. The next day, it crossed 100°E and moved into the North Indian Ocean, where it later developed into Cyclone Lehar.

Storm names 

Within the North-western Pacific Ocean, both the Japan Meteorological Agency (JMA) and the Philippine Atmospheric, Geophysical and Astronomical Services Administration assign names to tropical cyclones that develop in the Western Pacific, which can result in a tropical cyclone having two names. While the Philippine Atmospheric, Geophysical and Astronomical Services Administration assigns names to tropical cyclones which move into or form as a tropical depression in their area of responsibility located between 135°E and 115°E and between 5°N-25°N even if the cyclone has had an international name assigned to it. The names of significant tropical cyclones are retired, by both PAGASA and the Typhoon Committee. Should the list of names for the Philippine region be exhausted then names will be taken from an auxiliary list of which the first ten are published each season.

International names 

The JMA selected the names from a list of 140 names, that had been developed by the 14 members nations and territories of the ESCAP/WMO Typhoon Committee. During the season the names Leepi and Mangkhut were used for the first time, after they had replaced the names Xangsane and Durian, which were retired after the 2006 season.

After the season the Typhoon Committee retired the names Sonamu, Utor, Fitow and Haiyan from its naming lists, and in February 2015, the names were subsequently replaced with Jongdari, Barijat, Mun and Bailu for future seasons.

Philippines 

During the season PAGASA used its own naming scheme for the 25 tropical cyclones, that either developed within or moved into their self-defined area of responsibility. The names were taken from a list of names, that had been last used during 2009 and was used again during 2017. The names Fabian, Odette and Paolo were used for the first time during the year after the names Ondoy, and Pepeng were retired. The names Wilma, Yolanda, and Zoraida were also used for the first time (and only in the case of Yolanda).

After the season the names Labuyo, Santi and Yolanda were retired by PAGASA, as they had caused over 300 deaths and over PhP1 billion in damages. They were subsequently replaced on the list with Lannie, Salome and Yasmin.

Season effects 

This table lists all the storms that developed in the northwestern Pacific Ocean west of the International Date Line and north of the equator during 2013. It includes their intensity, duration, name, areas affected, deaths, and damage totals. Classification and intensity values are based on estimations conducted by the JMA. All damage figures are in 2013 USD. Damages and deaths from a storm include when the storm was a precursor wave or an extratropical low.

|-
| Sonamu (Auring) ||  || bgcolor=#| || bgcolor=#||| bgcolor=#||| Philippines, Vietnam, Borneo ||  Minimal ||  ||
|-
| Bising ||  || bgcolor=#| || bgcolor=#||| bgcolor=#||| Philippines ||  ||  None || 
|-
| Shanshan (Crising) ||  || bgcolor=#| || bgcolor=#||| bgcolor=#||| Philippines, Borneo ||  ||  || 
|-
| TD ||  || bgcolor=#| || bgcolor=#| || bgcolor=#||| Philippines ||  None ||  None ||
|-
| Yagi (Dante) ||  || bgcolor=#| || bgcolor=#||| bgcolor=#||| Philippines, Japan ||  None ||  None ||
|-
| TD ||  || bgcolor=#| || bgcolor=#||| bgcolor=#||| China, Hong Kong ||  None ||  None ||
|-
| Leepi (Emong) ||  || bgcolor=#| || bgcolor=#||| bgcolor=#||| Philippines, Taiwan, Ryukyu Islands, South Korea, Japan||  None ||  None ||
|-
| Bebinca (Fabian) ||  || bgcolor=#| || bgcolor=#||| bgcolor=#||| Philippines, China, Vietnam ||  ||  ||
|-
| Rumbia (Gorio) ||  || bgcolor=#| || bgcolor=#||| bgcolor=#||| Philippines, China ||  ||  || 
|-
| Soulik (Huaning) ||  || bgcolor=#| || bgcolor=#||| bgcolor=#||| Philippines, Japan, Taiwan, China ||  ||  ||
|-
| Cimaron (Isang) ||  || bgcolor=#| || bgcolor=#||| bgcolor=#||| Philippines, Taiwan, China ||  ||  || 
|-
| TD ||  || bgcolor=#| || bgcolor=#||| bgcolor=#||| None ||  None ||  None ||
|-
| Jebi (Jolina) ||  || bgcolor=#| || bgcolor=#||| bgcolor=#||| Philippines, China, Vietnam, Laos, Thailand||  ||  || 
|-
| Mangkhut (Kiko) ||  || bgcolor=#| || bgcolor=#||| bgcolor=#||| Philippines, Vietnam, China, Laos, Thailand ||  ||  || 
|-
| Utor (Labuyo) ||  || bgcolor=#| || bgcolor=#||| bgcolor=#||| Philippines, China ||  ||  || 
|-
| TD ||  || bgcolor=#| || bgcolor=#| || bgcolor=#| || None ||  None ||  None ||
|-
| 13W ||  || bgcolor=#| || bgcolor=#||| bgcolor=#||| Okinawa, China ||  None ||  None ||
|-
| Trami (Maring) ||  || bgcolor=#| || bgcolor=#||| bgcolor=#||| Philippines, Taiwan, Okinawa, China ||  ||  || 
|-
| Pewa ||  || bgcolor=#| || bgcolor=#||| bgcolor=#||| None ||  None ||  None ||
|-
| Unala ||  || bgcolor=#| || bgcolor=#||| bgcolor=#||| None ||  None ||  None ||
|-
| 03C ||  || bgcolor=#| || bgcolor=#||| bgcolor=#||| None ||  None ||  None ||
|-
| Kong-rey (Nando) ||  || bgcolor=#| || bgcolor=#||| bgcolor=#||| Philippines, Taiwan, China, Japan, South Korea ||  ||  || 
|-
| TD ||  || bgcolor=#| || bgcolor=#| || bgcolor=#| || None ||  None ||  None ||
|-
| TD ||  || bgcolor=#| || bgcolor=#| || bgcolor=#| || None ||  None ||  None ||
|-
| Yutu ||  || bgcolor=#| || bgcolor=#||| bgcolor=#||| None ||  None ||  None || 
|-
| Toraji ||  || bgcolor=#| || bgcolor=#||| bgcolor=#||| Taiwan, Japan ||  Minimal ||  ||
|-
| Man-yi ||  || bgcolor=#| || bgcolor=#||| bgcolor=#||| Japan, Kamchatka Peninsula ||  ||  || 
|-
| 18W ||  || bgcolor=#| || bgcolor=#||| bgcolor=#||| Vietnam, Laos, Thailand ||  ||  ||  
|-
| Usagi (Odette) ||  || bgcolor=#| || bgcolor=#| || bgcolor=#| || Philippines, Taiwan, China ||  ||  || 
|-
| Pabuk ||  || bgcolor=#| || bgcolor=#||| bgcolor=#||| Northern Mariana Islands ||  None ||  None ||
|-
| TD ||  || bgcolor=#| || bgcolor=#| || bgcolor=#| || None ||  None ||  None ||
|-
| Wutip (Paolo) ||  || bgcolor=#| || bgcolor=#||| bgcolor=#||| Philippines, Vietnam, Thailand, Laos, China ||  ||  || 
|-
| Sepat ||  || bgcolor=#| || bgcolor=#||| bgcolor=#||| Japan, Kamchatka Peninsula ||  None ||  None ||
|-
| Fitow (Quedan) ||  || bgcolor=#| || bgcolor=#||| bgcolor=#||| Philippines, Palau, Ryukyu Islands, Taiwan, China ||  ||  || 
|-
| Danas (Ramil) ||  || bgcolor=#| || bgcolor=#||| bgcolor=#||| Northern Mariana Islands, Guam, Ryukyu Islands, Japan, South Korea ||  ||  None ||
|-
| TD ||  || bgcolor=#| || bgcolor=#| || bgcolor=#||| None ||  None ||  None ||
|-
| Phailin ||  || bgcolor=#| || bgcolor=#| || bgcolor=#| || Malay Peninsula ||  None ||  None ||
|-
| Nari (Santi) ||  || bgcolor=#| || bgcolor=#||| bgcolor=#||| Philippines, China, Vietnam, Laos, Cambodia, Thailand ||  ||  || 
|-
| Wipha (Tino) ||  || bgcolor=#| || bgcolor=#||| bgcolor=#||| Northern Mariana Islands, Guam, Japan, Kamchatka Peninsula, Alaska ||  ||  || 
|-
| Francisco (Urduja) ||  || bgcolor=#| || bgcolor=#||| bgcolor=#||| Guam, Japan ||  ||  None ||
|-
| 27W ||  || bgcolor=#| || bgcolor=#||| bgcolor=#||| None ||  None ||  None ||
|-
| Lekima ||  || bgcolor=#| || bgcolor=#||| bgcolor=#||| Northern Mariana Islands, Iwo Jima, Japan ||  None ||  None ||
|-
| Krosa (Vinta) ||  || bgcolor=#| || bgcolor=#||| bgcolor=#||| Philippines, Taiwan, China, Vietnam ||  ||  ||
|-
| 30W (Wilma) ||  || bgcolor=#| || bgcolor=#||| bgcolor=#||| Palau, Philippines, Vietnam, Cambodia, Thailand, Myanmar ||  ||  None || 
|-
| Haiyan (Yolanda) ||  || bgcolor=#| || bgcolor=#||| bgcolor=#||| Chuuk, Yap, Palau, Philippines, Vietnam, Laos, China ||  ||  ||
|-
| Podul (Zoraida) ||  || bgcolor=#| || bgcolor=#||| bgcolor=#||| Palau, Philippines, Vietnam, Cambodia, Thailand ||  ||  || 
|-
| TD ||  || bgcolor=#| || bgcolor=#| || bgcolor=#| || Vietnam ||  None ||  None ||
|-
| Lehar ||  || bgcolor=#| || bgcolor=#| || bgcolor=#| || Indonesia, Malaysia, Thailand ||  None ||  None ||
|-
| 33W ||  || bgcolor=#| || bgcolor=#| || bgcolor=#| ||  ||  ||  ||
|-

See also 

 Tropical cyclones in 2013 
 Pacific typhoon season
 2013 Pacific hurricane season
 2013 Atlantic hurricane season
 2013 North Indian Ocean cyclone season
 South-West Indian Ocean cyclone seasons: 2012–13, 2013–14
 Australian region cyclone seasons: 2012–13, 2013–14
 South Pacific cyclone seasons: 2012–13, 2013–14

Notes

References

External links 

 
Pacific typhoon seasons
Articles which contain graphical timelines
2013 WPac